Flórida Paulista is a municipality in the state of São Paulo in Brazil. The population is 14,790 (2020 est.) in an area of 524 km².

Notable people
 Matilde Ribeiro, politician

References

Municipalities in São Paulo (state)